Oliver Charles Napier Moxon (June 1922 –1989), was a British author and Liberal Party politician.

Background
He was brother of actor Timothy Moxon. He was educated at Gresham's School, Holt.

Professional career
Moxon was variously an author/publisher, hotel proprietor and company director. During the Second World War he served as an RAF Officer. After the war, with his brother Timothy, he founded the New Torch Theatre in London. He founded the publishing company Book Express Ltd. He wrote Bitter Monsoon-The Memoirs of a Fighter Pilot (1955), a novel based on the memoirs of a fighter pilot during operations in Burma during World War II. He followed this up with The Last Monsoon (1957) and After the Monsoon (1958). 
He owned a restaurant on the North Coast of Jamaica.

Political career
In 1958 he was adopted as prospective Liberal candidate for Chelsea. However, he did not contest the 1959 General Election. He was Liberal candidate unsuccessfully at three parliamentary elections.

Electoral record

References

1922 births
1989 deaths
Liberal Party (UK) parliamentary candidates
People educated at Gresham's School
Royal Air Force personnel of World War II
Royal Air Force officers